Hurricane is a city in Washington County, Utah, United States. Its population was 20,036 as of the 2020 United States Census estimates. The Hurricane valley makes up the easternmost part of the St. George Metropolitan area and is becoming a tourist gateway town to Zion National Park. Hurricane is known for its historic peach and pecan orchards, open space, green fields and small-town charm, although like much of southwestern Utah, the Hurricane valley continues to experience significant population growth.

History
Hurricane was first settled in 1896 and received its name after a whirlwind blew the top off a buggy in which Erastus Snow was riding. Snow exclaimed, "Well, that was a Hurricane. We'll name this 'Hurricane Hill'."

Hurricane, which is pronounced "Her-ah-kun" by local residents (mimicking the accent of early Liverpudlian settlers), is in eastern Washington County. The community was settled as part of LDS Church President Brigham Young's "Cotton Mission", intended to establish the southern end of Utah for agricultural purposes. The town once operated a large peach and apricot orchard for the LDS Church and is historically known for growing peaches, pecans and pistachio nuts on small farms.

Places of interest
The town boasts multiple parks, a dog park, a city pool and large community center, several ranked golf courses, two reservoirs noted for bass fishing, boating and recreation (Sand Hollow and Quail Creek State Parks), as well as a small municipal airfield. The Hurricane Valley Heritage Park Museum is located on the corner of State Street and Main. There are several medical clinics in the area.

Hurricane Canal and Canal Trail
For approximately 80 years, the Hurricane Canal was the lifeblood of the Hurricane Valley. It was built over a period of 11 years (1893–1904), mostly by pick and shovel. Since 1985, the canal has lain empty. In 2000, special interest groups came together to preserve the canal, receiving grants and volunteering time to construct a trail to stand as a tribute to the efforts the early settlers put forth to make the canal a reality. A monument at the trailhead briefly recounts the canal story. Much of the trail, which covers a small section of the canal, is the actual west bank of the canal, which “canal riders” rode every day when the canal was in operation to ensure there were no leaks or other problems, since the bank was somewhat unstable. Two of the trail's unique aspects are walking in the canal itself – on a steel flume across a wash and through a tunnel immediately thereafter. The trail provides excellent views of the towns of Hurricane and La Verkin throughout. The trail ends before reaching the Virgin River Gorge, approximately five miles from the canal's former headwaters.

Geography
According to the United States Census Bureau, the city has a total area of 31.5 square miles (81.7 km2), of which 31.1 square miles (80.6 km2) is land and 0.4 square mile (1.1 km2) (1.39%) is water.

Notable geographic features

Sand Hollow State Park 
Sand Hollow State Park, which contains a 1,322 acre reservoir, multiple camping locations, and off-roading trails, is located in the south part of Hurricane. In addition to the sand beaches which are open to OHV's, the state park provides tunnel access across Utah State Route 7 to the neighboring Sand Mountain, which houses the popular Hurricane Sand Dunes. Sand Hollow can be accessed from Utah State Route 9, via Sand Hollow Road, or from the newly renovated State Route 7.

Quail Creek State Park 
Quail Creek State Park is home to a 600-acre reservoir and a campground. The reservoir it partially fed by Quail Creek to the north. The reservoir is a popular fishing, boating, kayaking, and paddle-boarding location. The state park can be accessed from either State Route 9 or Old Highway 91 via 5300 W/State Route 318.

Virgin River 
The Virgin River forms nearly all of Hurricane's north border. It travels through the city's Confluence Park and crosses State Route 9 at both the Hurricane-La Verkin border and near Quail Creek 3 miles from Harrisburg Junction. The river indirectly provides water to Hurricane, as well as to most of Washington County.

Transportation

Major roadways 

U.S. Interstate 15 forms part of the northwest border of Hurricane. It has one exit, exit 16, that is located in Hurricane, and another exit, exit 27, that provides access to Hurricane from the north. I-15 is the main means of transportation to nearby St. George and also connects the town to Salt Lake City, 290 miles to the north, and Las Vegas, 138 miles to the south.

Utah State Route 9 begins in Hurricane, at Harrisburg Junction. It travels east through Hurricane, forming State Street. SR-9 links Hurricane to the nearby Zion National Park and to U.S. Route 89. State Route 9 is also Hurricane's main connector to I-15.

Utah State Route 59 ends in Hurricane, at the intersection of SR-9 and Main Street. It connects Hurricane with the nearby Hilldale and indirectly connects Hurricane to Kanab and Lake Powell through Arizona State Route 389.

Utah State Route 7, also known as Southern Parkway, when finished with construction, will begin at State Route 9 just south of Hurricane's business district and provide access to Washington and South St. George. State Route 7 has its western terminus just north of the Arizona border in St. George where it becomes Sun River Parkway at I-15.

Airports 

Hurricane Municipal Airport, located in the south of Hurricane, is the city's only public airstrip. It has only one runway, currently has no taxiway, and only services small personal aircraft.

St. George Regional Airport is the closest airport which provides commercial service to select hubs. It can be accessed from Hurricane via State Route 7 (Southern Parkway). It connects Hurricane and Washington County with Salt Lake City, Denver, Phoenix, Los Angeles and Dallas-Fort Worth.

Harry Reid International Airport is the closest international airport to Hurricane, about 130 miles away. It can be accessed from Hurricane by travelling south on I-15 to Las Vegas.

Shuttles and buses 
Hurricane has no public transportation in the form of buses, but has shuttle service connecting with Salt Lake City, Las Vegas and Southern California via shuttle services in St. George.

Demographics

At the 2010 census, there were 13,748 people, 4,609 households and 3,545 families residing in the city. The racial makeup of the city was 91.3% White, 0.5% African American, 1.3% Native American, 0.5% Asian, 0.8% Pacific Islander, 3.32% from other races, and 2.3% from two or more races. Hispanic or Latino of any race were 2.72% of the population.

There were 4,609 households, of which 34.1% had children under the age of 18 living with them, 65.4% were married couples living together, 8% had a female householder with no husband present, and 23.1% were non-families. 19.5% of all households were made up of individuals, and 9.6% had someone living alone who was 65 years of age or older. The average household size was 2.87 and the average family size was 3.32.

Age distribution was 32.3% under the age of 19, 5.6% from 20 to 24, 11.2% from 25 to 44, 20.6% from 45 to 64, and 17.4% who were 65 years of age or older. The median age was 33.8 years. For every 100 females, there were 100.1 males. For every 100 females age 18 and over, there were 98.5 males.

The median household income was $32,865, and the median family income was $36,955. Males had a median income of $30,172 versus $19,588 for females. The per capita income for the city was $13,353. About 10.8% of families and 13.1% of the population were below the poverty line, including 19.2% of those under age 18 and 5.9% of those age 65 or over.

Economy

The one main boulevard is State Street, renovated and designated Utah SR-9. From 100 East to 400 West, the shopping district is designated as a "historical district", with ongoing preservation efforts. Many of the larger homes in town are listed on the National Registry of Historic Homes.

Tourism 
Situated on Utah State Route 9, Hurricane lies between Interstate 15 and Zion National Park and as a result has numerous motels, restaurants and other commercial establishments that serve a portion of the millions of tourists who visit Zion National Park each year. Hurricane also benefits from visitors who are on their way to or from Lake Powell and the North Rim of Grand Canyon National Park via Utah State Route 59, which intersects State Route 9 within Hurricane city limits. The Hurricane area is also a growing destination for mountain biking in Southwestern Utah, as the city is situated near the popular Gooseberry Mesa, J.E.M and Little Creek mountain biking trails.

Distribution Centers 
Old U.S. Highway 91 houses distribution centers for many companies. The biggest is the Walmart Distribution Center, which employs an estimated 700 associates. The road also houses distribution centers for Orgill, Pepsi-Cola, BlvdHome, PrimeSource Sanitary Supply and many smaller businesses.

Education 
Hurricane is a part of the Washington County School District.

Hurricane has one high school, Hurricane High School (encompassing grades 10–12), attended also by students from the surrounding communities of La Verkin, Toquerville and Springdale, among others. There are also two elementary schools, an intermediate school (grades 6–7) and a middle school (grades 8–9), as well as one charter school, Valley Academy (grades K-8).

In popular culture 

 Hurricane appears in the novel Five Nights at Freddy's: The Silver Eyes and its two sequels, which are part of the Five Nights at Freddy's franchise. In the novels, Hurricane is the former location of Freddy Fazbear's Pizza and the hometown of the protagonists.

 Hurricane is a scenery town in American Truck Simulator.

 Part of Katy Perry's "Rise" music video was filmed in Sand Hollow State Park, with Sullivan Knoll featured in the background in July 2016.

Notable people
Oliver DeMille, author, educator and public speaker
Derral Eves, co-founder of The Chosen
James Judd, legislator, businessman, and LDS church leader
Don Leo Jonathan, wrestler
Bradley Last, politician in the Utah House of Representatives
W. Paul Reeve, historian and professor at the University of Utah
Donald L. Staheli, business executive and general authority of the LDS church
Herb Wilkinson, led Utah to its only NCAA Tournament Championship in 1943–44, and later was a three time All American basketball player at Iowa
Sylvan Wittwer, agronomist who acted as director of Michigan State University's agricultural experiment station and developed a chemical called Gibberellins

See also

 List of cities and towns in Utah
 Purgatory Correctional Facility

References

External links 

 
 Hurricane Valley Chamber of Commerce

Populated places established in 1896
Cities in the Mojave Desert
Cities in Utah
Cities in Washington County, Utah
1896 establishments in Utah